Ioka may refer to:

Places
 Ioka, Utah, an unincorporated community in eastern Duchesne County, Utah, United States

People with the surname
, Japanese boxer
, Japanese boxer, nephew of Hiroki

Japanese-language surnames